Doosan Arena, previously known as Stadion města Plzně (Plzeň City Stadium) is a multi-purpose stadium in Plzeň, Czech Republic. It is located in Štrunc Park near the confluence of the Mže and Radbuza rivers. The stadium is currently used mostly for football matches and is the home ground of FC Viktoria Plzeň. The stadium holds 11,700 people. It is also known as Stadion ve Štruncových sadech (Stadium in Štrunc Park), named after Emil Štrunc, a former regional chieftain of the Sokol Movement (some people incorrectly think it is named after a famous local footballer Stanislav Štrunc).

History
The stadium was opened in 1955 for the regional Spartakiad. After various construction enlargements, its capacity was 35,000 people, 7,600 of which were seated. In 2002–03 it underwent reconstruction to comply with the needs of football association and the capacity lowered significantly to 7,425 people.

2011 reconstruction 
In April 2011, work costing approximately 360 million Czech koruna got under way to modernise the stadium in line with UEFA criteria. While the reconstruction was in progress, the capacity of the stadium was reduced to 3,500 spectators. At the end of August 2011, part of the 2011 reconstruction had finished, leaving the stadium with a new capacity of around 8,500. In December 2011, the reconstruction was finished with a resultant capacity of almost 12,000.

In 2011, Plzeň played in the 2011–12 UEFA Champions League group stage. However, home matches were played at Synot Tip Arena in Prague due to the reconstruction. In January 2012, the stadium was approved for use in Plzeň's 2011–12 UEFA Europa League match with Schalke 04.

Average Attendance 
1993/94 – 5,774
1994/95 – 4,573
1995/96 – 3,441
1996/97 – 4,626
1997/98 – 3,819
1998/99 – 4,033
2000/01 – 3,073
2003/04 – 3,622
2005/06 – 4,118
2006/07 – 4,836
2007/08 – 3,828
2008/09 – 4,005
2009/10 – 3,629
2010/11 – 6,415
2011/12 – 7,009
2012/13 – 10,046
2013/14 – 10,089
2014/15 – 10,868

International matches
Doosan Arena has hosted one friendly and seven competitive matches of the Czech Republic national football team

References

External links 
 information at club's official website 
 Stadium Guide Article

Football venues in the Czech Republic
Czech First League venues
Sports venues in Plzeň
Multi-purpose stadiums in the Czech Republic
FC Viktoria Plzeň
Sports venues completed in 1955
1955 establishments in Czechoslovakia
20th-century architecture in the Czech Republic